This article lists the complete results of the group stage of the 2015 Sudirman Cup Group 1 in Dongguan, China.

Group 1A

China vs Germany

Thailand vs Germany

China vs Thailand

Group 1B

Japan vs Russia

Chinese Taipei vs Russia

Japan vs Chinese Taipei

Group 1C

Denmark vs England

Indonesia vs England

Denmark vs Indonesia

Group 1D

Korea vs Malaysia

India vs Malaysia

Korea vs India

References

Sudirman Cup
Sudirman Cup Group 1